Royce Campbell (born June 7, 1952) is a jazz guitarist from Indiana who was a member of the Henry Mancini orchestra for twenty years.

Musical career
He was born in North Vernon, Indiana. When he was five, his mother married a career Navy man, and Campbell grew up in cities throughout the U.S. and the world. Exposure to a variety of genres contributed to his musical style. A love for rock and roll marked his first connection with the guitar, at the age of nine, when he discovered Chuck Berry. Like many guitarists of his generation, he was influenced by Jimi Hendrix and Eric Clapton.

By the time he finished high school in Spain in the early 1970s, he had decided to pursue a career in music. His uncle, pianist Carroll DeCamp, who had done arrangements for Stan Kenton and Les Elgart, invited him to Indianapolis to live and study. His uncle provided his education in music theory and composition. At 21, he toured with rhythm and blues (R&B) singer Marvin Gaye before spending twenty years as a member of the Henry Mancini orchestra. He held the job until Mancini's death in 1994.

During the 1990s, Campbell recorded more as a leader. In 1993, he produced Project G-5: A Tribute to Wes Montgomery which also featured guitarists Tal Farlow, Jimmy Raney, Herb Ellis, and fellow Hoosier Cal Collins. His 1994 album 6x6 featured guitarists Pat Martino, John Abercrombie, Larry Coryell, Dave Stryker, and Bucky Pizzarelli. On Project G-5: A Tribute to Joe Pass (1999) he combined the talents of Charlie Byrd, Gene Bertoncini, Mundell Lowe, and John Pisano.

In November 2010, Campbell was inducted into the Indianapolis Jazz Foundation Hall of Fame.

Discography

References

Additional sources 
 Benedetto, Robert. Making an Archtop Guitar. Anaheim Hills, CA: Centerstream Publishing, 1994. xiii.
 Boyd, Herb. "CD Reviews: A Tribute to Henry Mancini". Down Beat 63.6 (June 1996): 45.
 Cook, Richard, and Brian Morton. The Penguin Guide to Jazz. 9th ed. New York, NY: The Penguin Group, 2008. 221, 1209.
 Ellis, Andy. "A Tribute to Wes Montgomery". Guitar Player 29.2 (Feb 1995): 146.
 Ellis, Andy. "Hands Across the Water". Guitar Player 32.12 (Dec 1998): 139.
 Ephland, John. "Rudy Linka-Royce Campbell". Down Beat 74.3 (March 2007): 71.
 Ephland, John. "Traveling Guitars". Down Beat 76.2 (Feb 2009): 71.
 Erlewine, Stephen Thomas, ed. All Music Guide to Jazz: The Definitive Guide to Jazz. 4th ed. San Francisco, CA: Backstreet Publishing, 2002. 1063.
 Esposito, Russell R. The Golden Milestone. 4th ed. New York, NY: The New York Learning Library, 2007. 320.
 Ingram, Adrian. Mel Bay Concise History of the Electric Guitar. Pacific, MO: Mel Bay Publications, 2006. 106.
 Ingram, Adrian. The Gibson L5. Anaheim Hills, CA: Centerstream Publishing, 1997. 7, 68, 74.
 Koert, Hans. "The Five Guitars". IAJRC Journal 40.4 (Dec 2007): 71–72.
 Koransky, Jason. "Project Shopping". Down Beat 66.6 (June 1999): 53.
 Larkin, Colin, ed. Encyclopedia of Popular Music. 4th ed. US: Oxford University Press, 2006.
 Levy, Adam. "Royce Campbell". Guitar Player 33.12 (Dec 1999): 41.
 Resnicoff, Matt. "Project G-5: A Tribute to Wes Montgomery". Guitar Player 29.6 (June 1995): 29–30.
 Smith, Will. "Six by Six: A Jazz Guitar Celebration". Down Beat 72.7 (July 2005): 76.

References 
 

Living people
1952 births
American jazz guitarists
American jazz composers
American male jazz composers
People from Seymour, Indiana
Guitarists from Indiana
20th-century American guitarists
American male guitarists
20th-century American male musicians